Balut Hesar (also Romanized as Balūţ Ḩeşār and Balooţ Ḩeşār; also known as Bālā Ḩeşār and Bala Hisār) is a village in Kafsh Kanan Rural District, in the Central District of Bahmai County, Kohgiluyeh and Boyer-Ahmad Province, Iran. At the 2006 census, its population was 28, in 6 families.

References 

Populated places in Bahmai County